Andrew Morris is a musician from Brisbane, Queensland. He is a former member of Palladium and is part of The Wilson Pickers, performs in a duo with Danny Widdicombe and has a solo career. In 2008 he won (with Widdicombe) the Grant McLennan Memorial Scholarship.

Biography 

In 2008 Andrew Morris on acoustic guitar  and vocals formed a country blues band the Wilson Pickers alongside John Bedggood on fiddle, mandolin and backing vocals, Sime Nugent on harmonica, guitar and backing vocals, Ben Salter on banjo and vocals and Danny Widdicombe on resonator guitar and vocals.

Discography

Studio albums

Awards

Q Song Awards
The Queensland Music Awards (previously known as Q Song Awards) are annual awards celebrating Queensland, Australia's brightest emerging artists and established legends. They commenced in 2006.

 (wins only)
|-
| 2007
| "See the Smoke" 
| World / Folk Song of the Year
| 
|-

References

External links
 

Living people
Musicians from Brisbane
Year of birth missing (living people)